WWII Aces is a flight simulator video game set in World War II for the Wii. It was developed by Slovak studio Arcade Moon.

Gameplay
WWII Aces allows players to choose to play as a pilot in the Royal Air Force, Luftwaffe, or the Red Army Air Force. It features 12 planes including: Spitfire, Stuka, and Mosquito bomber. The game will also put players in battles such as the Battle of Dunkirk, and the Battle of the Bulge. The game has similar controls to that of the Wii version of Blazing Angels: Squadrons of WWII. The game also features over 70 missions where the player is given the task of strategic bombing, air support, paratrooper drops, etc.

Each country in the game has 4 planes to choose from: a fighter, a dive bomber, a heavy bomber, and a special project plane.

Reception
The game received negative reviews. Criticism was focused on unresponsive controls, bad graphics, and being very frustrating.

 GameSpot - 3.5/10
 IGN - 4.5/10
 Metacritic - 41/100
 GameRankings - 37/100

References

External links
Destineer Studios website

World War II flight simulation video games
2008 video games
Wii games
Wii-only games
North America-exclusive video games
Video games developed in Slovakia